A nimbostratus cloud is a multi-level, amorphous, nearly uniform and often dark grey cloud that usually produces continuous rain, snow or sleet but no lightning or thunder.

Although it is usually a low-based cloud, it actually forms most commonly in the middle level of the troposphere and then spreads vertically into the low and high levels. Nimbostratus usually produces precipitation over a wide area.

Nimbo- is from the Latin word nimbus, which denotes cloud or halo.

Downward-growing nimbostratus can have the same vertical extent as most large upward-growing cumulus, but its horizontal extent tends to be even greater.

Appearance
Although usually dark at its base, it often appears illuminated from within to a surface observer. Though found worldwide, nimbostratus occurs more commonly in the middle latitudes. It is coded CM2 on the SYNOP report.

Formation
Nimbostratus occurs along a warm front or occluded front where the slowly rising warm air mass creates nimbostratus along with shallower stratus clouds producing less rain, these clouds being preceded by higher-level clouds such as cirrostratus and altostratus. Often, when an altostratus cloud thickens and descends into lower altitudes, it will become nimbostratus.

Nimbostratus, unlike cumulonimbus, is not associated with thunderstorms, however at an unusually unstable warm front caused as a result of the advancing warm air being hot, humid and unstable, cumulonimbus clouds may be embedded within the usual nimbostratus. Lightning from an embedded cumulonimbus cloud may interact with the nimbostratus but only in the immediate area around it. In this situation with lightning and rain occurring it would be hard to tell which type of cloud was producing the rain from the ground, however cumulonimbus tend to produce larger droplets and more intense downpours. The occurrence of cumulonimbus and nimbostratus together is uncommon, and usually only nimbostratus is found at a warm front and sometimes in cold front.

Forecast

Nimbostratus is generally a sign of an approaching warm or occluded front producing steady moderate precipitation, as opposed to the shorter period of typically heavier precipitation released by a cold-frontal cumulonimbus cloud. Precipitation may last for several days, depending on the speed of the frontal system. A nimbostratus virga cloud is the same as normal nimbostratus, but the rain or snow falls as virga which doesn't reach the ground. Stratus or stratocumulus usually replace the nimbostratus after the passage of the warm or occluded front.

Origin of name

Under Luke Howard's first systematized study of clouds, carried out in France in 1802, three general cloud forms were established based on appearance and characteristics of formation: cirriform, cumuliform and stratiform. These were further divided into upper and lower types depending on altitude. In addition to these three main types, Howard added two names to designate multiple cloud types joined together: cumulostratus, a blending of cumulus clouds and stratus layers, and nimbus, a complex blending of cirriform, cumuliform, and stratiform clouds with sufficient vertical development to produce significant precipitation.

Later, in the 20th century, an IMC commission for the study of clouds put forward a refined and more restricted definition of the genus nimbus, effectively reclassifying it as a stratiform cloud type. It was then renamed nimbostratus, and published with the new name in the 1932 edition of the International Atlas of Clouds and of States of the Sky. This left cumulonimbus as the only nimboform type as indicated by its root name.

Subtypes and derivative types
Species and varieties: Nimbostratus is very thick, opaque, and featureless, so this genus type is not subdivided into species or varieties.
Precipitation-based supplementary features: Nimbostratus is a major precipitation cloud and produces the virga or praecipitatio features.  The latter can achieve heavy intensity due to the cloud's vertical depth.
Accessory cloud: Nimbostratus pannus is an accessory cloud of nimbostratus that forms as a ragged layer in precipitation below the main cloud deck. Pannus is coded CL7.
Genitus mother clouds: This genus type can form from cumulus and cumulonimbus.
Mutatus mother clouds: Nimbostratus can form due to the complete transformation of altocumulus, altostratus and stratocumulus.

Relation to other clouds 
Multi-level nimbostratus is physically related to other stratiform genus-types by way of being non-convective in nature. However, the other sheet-like clouds usually each occupy only one or two levels at the same time. Although altostratus forms mostly in the middle level of the troposphere, strong frontal lift can push it into the lower part of the high-level. The main high-level stratiform cloud is cirrostratus which is composed of ice crystals that often produce halo effects around the sun. Of the non-stratiform clouds, cumulonimbus and cumulus congestus are the most closely related to nimbostratus because of their vertical extent and ability to produce moderate to heavy precipitation. The remaining cumuliform (cumulus) and stratocumuliform (stratocumulus, altocumulus, and cirrocumulus) clouds have the least in common with nimbostratus.

See also 

 Nimbostratus virga
 Cumulonimbus
 List of cloud types

References

External links

 National Science Digital Library - Nimbostratus
 Nimbostratus and Other Low Clouds

Stratus